The Société littéraire de Liège was a literary society in Liège.

It was set up on 5 April 1779 by François-Charles de Velbrück during his reign as prince bishop of Liege. It aimed to provide its members with newspapers and books in a convivial atmosphere, on the model of other literary societies of the time, like the Cabinet littéraire de Verviers, the Société littéraire de Huy, the Société royale littéraire de Hasselt, the Cercle de l’Union de Maastricht, the "Aachener Casino Club" in Aachen, the Société littéraire de Gand, the Société de littérature de Bruxelles (whose successor, the Société des Douze, is still active), and the famous Gabinetto Vieusseux.

It is still active and provides cultural activities and meeting for its members. It has reciprocal ties with the Cercle Gaulois in Brussels and publishes a quarterly newsletter entitled Lettre de la Littéraire.

References

External links
Official site

Culture in Liège
Prince-Bishopric of Liège
Literary societies
1779 establishments in the Holy Roman Empire
Learned societies of Belgium
Organizations established in 1779